Marc Pedraza Sarto (born 6 February 1987) is a Spanish professional footballer who plays as a midfielder for CE L'Hospitalet.

Club career
Born in Barcelona, Catalonia, Pedraza was a product of local RCD Espanyol's youth ranks. He spent his first senior season with the B team in Segunda División B, scoring ten goals but also being relegated. The following year he upgraded to Segunda División and was loaned to Deportivo Alavés, appearing sparingly as the Basques also dropped down a tier.

Returning to his native region, Pedraza continued to be mainly associated with Espanyol's reserves. He played his first La Liga match on 2 January 2010, coming on as a substitute for José Callejón in the last minute of a 0–1 away loss against Valencia CF.

In the summer of 2010, Pedraza was released by Espanyol, but in October he signed with another club in his native region, third-tier CE L'Hospitalet. He returned to the second level after three full seasons, joining CD Numancia on a two-year contract.

On 28 July 2017, Pedraza agreed to a three-year deal at RCD Mallorca. Under manager Vicente Moreno, he was an undisputed starter as the side achieved two consecutive promotions, but took part in only three games in the 2019–20 campaign, being subsequently released.

Pedraza returned to the third division on 12 August 2020, signing with FC Andorra, a club owned by Gerard Piqué. On 18 July 2022, after helping in the club's first-ever promotion to the second level, he returned to Hospi, with the club in Tercera Federación.

Personal life
Pedraza's father, Ángel, was also a footballer. A defender and midfielder, he played professionally for FC Barcelona and Mallorca, going on to coach his son at Hospitalet in one match.

Honours
Spain U19
UEFA European Under-19 Championship: 2006

References

External links

1987 births
Living people
Footballers from Barcelona
Spanish footballers
Association football midfielders
La Liga players
Segunda División players
Primera Federación players
Segunda División B players
Tercera División players
RCD Espanyol B footballers
RCD Espanyol footballers
Deportivo Alavés players
CE L'Hospitalet players
CD Numancia players
RCD Mallorca players
FC Andorra players
Spain youth international footballers
Spanish expatriate footballers
Expatriate footballers in Andorra
Spanish expatriate sportspeople in Andorra